Lillian F. Mills is an American accountant and academic administrator.

Mills completed bachelor's and master's degrees in accounting at the University of Florida in 1980 and 1981, respectively, before moving to the University of Michigan to earn a doctorate in the subject, where she was advised by Joel Slemrod and published the dissertation Essays in Corporate Tax Compliance and Financial Reporting in 1996. She was a research fellow at the United States Department of the Treasury and worked as a certified public accountant for two firms from 1981 to 1989 before joining the University of Arizona faculty in 1997. She taught at UArizona until 2005, and accepted a teaching position at the University of Texas at Austin the following academic year. At UTAustin, Mills held the Beverly H. and William P. O'Hara Chair in Business as well as the Lois and Richard Folger Dean's Leadership Chair. She became interim dean of the McCombs School of Business in April 2020, upon Jay Hartzell's elevation to interim president of the University of Texas at Austin. In June 2021, Mills was appointed to the deanship permanently, and is the first woman to serve in that position.

References

University of Michigan alumni
University of Texas at Austin faculty
University of Arizona faculty
University of Florida alumni
Living people
American accountants
Business school deans
American university and college faculty deans
Women deans (academic)
Women accountants
Year of birth missing (living people)
Accounting academics
20th-century American academics
21st-century American academics
American women academics